Randi is a surname. Notable people with the surname include:

Antonio Randi, Italian wrestler
Don Randi, American keyboard player, bandleader and songwriter
Ermanno Randi, Italian film actor
James Randi ("The Amazing Randi"), Canadian-American stage magician and scientific skeptic
Leah Randi, American bass player and vocalist

See also
Randi (given name)
Randi (disambiguation)